is a train station located in Kurume, Fukuoka.

Lines 
Nishi-Nippon Railroad
Tenjin Ōmuta Line

Platforms

Adjacent stations

Surrounding area
 Japan Element Industry Kurume Factory
 Kurume Koiki Fire Department Nishi Substation
 Tsubuku Elementary School
 Joyful Yasutake
 Sumita Clinic

Railway stations in Fukuoka Prefecture
Railway stations in Japan opened in 1912